Abram S. Isaacs (1851-1920)  was an American rabbi, author, and professor.  Isaacs received his education at the New York University, from which he was graduated in 1871.  He became a Rabbi at Barnett Memorial Temple at Paterson, New Jersey. For thirty-five years he occupied a chair at the New York University, first as Professor of Hebrew, then of Germanic languages, and later of Semitics.  Starting in 1878, he edited The Jewish Messenger, a weekly publication devoted to Jewish communal affairs.  It became merged in The American Hebrew in 1903, at which time Isaacs withdrew from editorial work. He was also a frequent contributor to  periodicals, writing on Judaism and Jewish issues.  He published several books, including: A Modern Hebrew Poet: The Life and Writings of Moses Chaim Luzzatto, published in 1878, What is Judaism? and Stories from the Rabbis.  For the Encyclopedia Americana he edited the Semitic department. Isaacs wrote the hymn "A Noble Life, a Simple Faith" in the Union Hymnal. Isaacs died at Paterson, N.J., on December 22, 1920.

Isaacs' father was Rabbi Samuel Myer Isaacs, and his brother was lawyer and judge Myer S. Isaacs.

References

Bibliography
A Modern Hebrew Poet: The Life and Writings of Moses Chaim Luzzatto,  1878
School days in our Hometown, memoir
What is Judaism?, Knickerbocker Press, 1912
 Stories from the Rabbis, 1926
Step-By-Step: A Story of the Early Days of Moses Mendelssohn, 1910
Under the Sabbath Lamp: Stories of Our Time for Old and Young, 1919
"Talmud" article in The Encyclopedia Americana, Encyclopedia Americana Corp., 1919
The Vision of Huna, poem, published in The Standard Book of Jewish Verse, 1917

External links
"Abram S. Isaac", article in American Jewish year book Volume 23,  Jewish Publication Society of America, Cyrus Adler, Henrietta Szold (Eds), 	  1921, pp 80–83.  Online: 

1851 births
1920 deaths
19th-century American rabbis